Dagny was a Swedish language women's magazine that existed between 1886 and 1913. The title of the magazine bore the statement  (Swedish: published by the Fredrika Bremer Association), which indicated the publisher. It was subtitled  (Swedish: Journal for social and literary interests). It is the first Swedish magazine which covered social issues from women's perspective and from 1903 assumed a leading position in the suffrage movement in Sweden.

History and profile
Dagny was launched in 1886 as a successor to another women's magazine, Tidskrift för hemmet, which was published from 1859 to 1885. The publisher was Fredrika Bremer Association. According to doctor , son of doctor Salomon Henschen, the periodical was named after his sister, translator . The magazine was headquartered in Stockholm and published on a weekly basis. The editor of Dagny was Lotten Dahlgren, who held the post between 1891 and 1907. 

The page number of the magazine varied between 15 and 35 in the period 1900 to 1907 and was 12 from 1908 to 1913. Its size was 22 cm in 1900–1907 and 32 cm in 1908–1913.

Dagny folded in 1913 and was succeeded by Hertha, another women's magazine. The full issues of Dagny have been archived in the Swedish National Archives and in the Gothenburg University Library.

References

External links

1886 establishments in Sweden
1913 disestablishments in Sweden
Defunct literary magazines published in Europe
Defunct magazines published in Sweden
Feminism in Sweden
Feminist magazines
First-wave feminism
Literary magazines published in Sweden
Magazines established in 1886
Magazines disestablished in 1913
Magazines published in Stockholm
Swedish-language magazines
Weekly magazines published in Sweden
Women's magazines published in Sweden